Suman Mahato (born 4 December 1964) was a member of the 14th Lok Sabha of India. A member of the Jharkhand Mukti Morcha (JMM) political party, she represented the constituency of Jamshedpur in the eastern state of Jharkhand.

She became MP in the by-elections after her husband and sitting MP Sunil Kumar Mahato was assassinated by suspected Maoist rebels near Ghatsila in East Singhbhum district on 4 March 2007 while he was attending a local football match organised to mark the Hindu festival of Holi. She served in parliament from 2007 to 2009.

References

External links
 Home Page on the Parliament of India's Website

1964 births
Living people
India MPs 2004–2009
Jharkhand Mukti Morcha politicians
People from Seraikela Kharsawan district
People from Jamshedpur
People from East Singhbhum district
Lok Sabha members from Jharkhand
Women in Jharkhand politics
21st-century Indian women politicians
21st-century Indian politicians